The 1935 Mercer Bears football team was an American football team that represented Mercer University as a member of both the Dixie Conference and the Southern Intercollegiate Athletic Association (SIAA) during the 1935 college football season. In their seventh year under head coach Lake Russell, the team compiled a 4–5 record.

Schedule

References

Mercer
Mercer
Mercer Bears football seasons
Mercer Bears football